Margaret Anne Florence is an actress, singer, and model based in New York City.  Margaret Anne has been featured in major motion pictures, television, independent films, and on the New York stage. She frequently appears in national and international television commercials and print advertisements.

Early life
Florence was born and raised in Charleston, South Carolina. She was a member of a local theater company called The Charleston Youth Company.

Florence received a Masters in Music Theatre Performance, cum laude, from New York University and a B.A. in Music/Classical Voice, cum laude, from the College of Charleston. She received the Bishop Robert Smith Award, the highest undergraduate honor at the College of Charleston.  In 2009, Florence was honored with the College of Charleston's Young Alumna of the Year Award.

Films

The Mighty Macs and The One
Florence co-starred as Rosemary Keenan, alongside Carla Gugino and Ellen Burstyn, in The Mighty Macs, released nationwide on October 21, 2011 and based on the true story of Basketball Hall of Fame coach Cathy Rush, who led Immaculata University to the 1972 National Women's Collegiate Championship.  In 2010, The Mighty Macs won both the Best Feature and Audience Award at the John Paul II International Film Festival in Miami, and was an Official Selection at the Heartland Film Festival and two other independent film festivals. She can be seen in the movie's official trailer, which was released in September 2009.

Florence starred as the female lead in  the 2011 film The One, alongside Jon Prescott and Ian Novick.

Additional Hollywood roles
Florence's first film role was in 2006's My Super Ex-Girlfriend. In 2009, she played the role of Alexis Danella in the horror-thriller The New Daughter.

Television
Florence appeared on 30 Rock'''s 2012 hour-long Valentine's Day episode "Hey, Baby, What's Wrong". She appeared in the CBS drama Blue Bloods episode "Brothers" (2010). She had a recurring, three-episode arc as Marlene during Guiding Light's 2007–2008 season. She appeared in the Law & Order episode "Excalibur" (2008), the White Collar episode "Flip of the Coin" (2009), and the Nurse Jackie episode "Apple Bong" (2010). She appeared in 2017 in the series Sun Records, and starred in the 2018 Lifetime TV movie A Sister's Secret.

Broadway

The Light in the Piazza

The Fantasticks
Beginning on July 21, 2008, Florence starred as 'Luisa' in the revival of the famous Broadway musical The Fantasticks at the Snapple Theater Center (renamed the Jerry Orbach Theater during this run as a credit to that actor's role in the original musical).  Florence's final performance as Luisa took place on December 17, 2008.

Additional theatrical productions
Florence appeared in regional productions of Godspell, Little Shop of Horrors, Maccabeat!, Company, Street Scene (based on the Pulitzer Prize winning play by Elmer Rice), and Jacques Brel is Alive and Well and Living in Paris.

Other acting
Florence starred in Death Cab for Cutie's music video for What Sarah Said from the band's 2005 studio album, Plans.  The What Sarah Said video was included in the band's 2006 DVD, Directions: The Plans Video Album'', which was nominated for Best Long Form Music Video at the 2007 Grammy Awards.

References

External links
 

1978 births
American film actresses
Living people
Steinhardt School of Culture, Education, and Human Development alumni
College of Charleston alumni
American television actresses
American musical theatre actresses
Actresses from Charleston, South Carolina
Actresses from New York City
21st-century American women